James J. Bruin (October 31, 1898 – January 26, 1949) was an American politician from Lowell, Massachusetts.

Early life
Bruin was born on October 31, 1898, in Lowell. In 1922 he graduated from the Northeastern University School of Law.

Political career
Bruin served on the Lowell school committee from 1923 to 1925. In 1932 he was the Democratic nominee for the United States House of Representatives seat in Massachusetts's 5th congressional district, but lost to incumbent Edith Nourse Rogers. From 1934 to 1935 he was the mayor of Lowell. In 1934 he was the Democratic nominee for Middlesex County District Attorney, but lost to incumbent Warren L. Bishop. In 1948, Bruin returned to elected office as a member of the Lowell city council. Later that year he was elected to the Massachusetts House of Representatives. However, Bruin died on January 26, 1949, soon after taking office.

See also
 1949–1950 Massachusetts legislature

References

1898 births
1949 deaths
Massachusetts lawyers
Mayors of Lowell, Massachusetts
Democratic Party members of the Massachusetts House of Representatives
Northeastern University School of Law alumni
20th-century American politicians
20th-century American lawyers